Pirate Radio is a career-spanning box set compilation album by The Pretenders. Released on 14 March 2006, it contains songs from 1979 to 2005, from hit singles, popular album tracks, non-album recordings, soundtrack contributions, live tracks, as well as previously unreleased material. The box set comes in four CDs along with a DVD of selected live performances from 1979 to 1995. A 60-page booklet and a poster is also included.

Track listing
All tracks are written by Chrissie Hynde, except where noted.

Note
Despite the box set stating the video of "Room Full of Mirrors" is from the band's live performance at the 2003 Montreux Jazz Festival, it is actually the music video for the song. Meaning that the live performances on the DVD go up to 1995, not 2003, as stated on the box set.

References

The Pretenders compilation albums
2006 compilation albums
Rhino Records compilation albums
Sire Records compilation albums
Warner Records compilation albums